Tatiana Olga Okupnik vel Tatiana (born 2 September 1978, Łódź, Poland) is a Polish singer, composer and songwriter. She has a characteristic, unique voice timbre. She has collaborated with musicians such as Tim Hutton, Wyclef Jean, Lenny White and was a member of Blue Café, a Polish band, where she was lead singer from the band's early years until 2005. In 2012, Okupnik joined the judging panel on the second series of the Polish reality television competition X Factor.

Discography

Studio albums

Singles

As featured artist

Music videos

References

1978 births
Living people
Musicians from Łódź
University of Łódź alumni
Polish jazz singers
Polish pop singers
Polish R&B singers
Polish soul singers
English-language singers from Poland
21st-century Polish singers
21st-century Polish women singers